Michigan Wolverines football All-Americans are American football players who have been named as All-Americans while playing for the University of Michigan football team.

Overview
Since 1898, 134 Michigan Wolverines football players have earned first-team All-American honor.

William Cunningham was the first in 1898 based on a performance that led Louis Elbel to write "The Victors". Neil Snow was the second in 1901 based on his role on the 1901 team that outscored its opponents 550–0. Willie Heston was the first Michigan All-American selected by Walter Camp.

There are two players who have earned the distinction three times: Bennie Oosterbaan (1925–1927) and Anthony Carter (1980–1982).

There are twenty-three others who have won the distinction twice: Willie Heston, Albert Benbrook, Benny Friedman, Chuck Bernard, Ted Petoskey, Tom Harmon, Alvin Wistert, Robert Wahl, Ron Kramer, Bill Yearby, Dave Brown, Mark Donahue, Jumbo Elliott, Mark Messner, Tripp Welborne, Greg Skrepenak, Charles Woodson, Steve Hutchinson, Marlin Jackson, Jake Long, Taylor Lewan, Jake Butt and Jourdan Lewis.

Twenty-five Michigan players have been unanimous All-American selections: Bennie Oosterbaan, Harry Newman, Chuck Bernard, Ralph Heikkinen, Tom Harmon, Bill Daley, Bob Chappuis, Ron Kramer, Jack Clancy, Jim Mandich, Mike Taylor, Dave Brown, Mark Donahue, Anthony Carter, Mark Messner, Tripp Welborne, Desmond Howard, Greg Skrepenak, Charles Woodson, Steve Hutchinson, Braylon Edwards, Jake Long, Jabrill Peppers, Aidan Hutchinson, and Blake Corum.

Two players have been selected as unanimous All-Americans twice: Anthony Carter and Tripp Welborne.

Sortable chart of Michigan's All-Americans

References

Michigan Wolverines

Michigan sports-related lists